is a manga series created  by Shinobu Inokuma, the author of Salad Days. It is based on a novel by Hikaru Murozumi, and is set in a fictional trade-school—that focuses on the mizu shōbai—located in the Kabukichō district of Shinjuku, Tokyo.

The school's focus is to give students their last chance in the school system.  Classes are divided into occupations such as hostesses, hosts, "managers" (from waiters to actual managers), "geibaa" ("gay bar" but is a more comedic view of males dressing and acting like females) and, finally, "soapgirls".

The series has a sequel, Toritsu Mizusho! 2, with one volume published as of March 2012. Oda Mari, now a teacher at the high school, replaces Keisuke Tanabe as the focus character.

Characters
The volume number denotes the character's first appearance. The actor/actress is the person that was cast for the character in the TV special.

: Sociology teacher (vol. 1)
: Fuzoku Course Director (vol. 1)
: Headmaster (vol. 1)
: Host Course Director (vol. 1)
: Gay Bar Course Director (vol. 1)
: Manager Course Director (vol. 1)
: Music teacher (vol. 6)
 (Mari Koyama in TV version): Fuzoku Course student (vol. 1)
: Manager Course student (vol. 1)
: Athletics Director (vol. 1)
: Fuzoku Course student (vol. 1)
: Chairman of the Tokyo Metropolitan School Board (vol. 1)
: Gay Bar Course student (vol. 1)
: Fuzoku Course student (vol. 3)
: Hostess Course student (vol. 4)
: Manager Course student (vol. 5)
: Hostess Course student (vol. 6)
Reira Yamaguchi (played by: Risa Kudo): Hostess Course student (vol. 8)
: Hostess Course student (vol. 9)
: Hostess Course student (vol. 9)
: Hostess Course student (vol. 11)
Etsuko Yamaguchi (TV only; played by: Mariko Tsutsui)
Moe Akiba (TV only; played by: Aki Hoshino)
Kyoto (TV only; played by: Kenji Anan)

References

External links
 Official site at Young Sunday (Japanese)
 Official Live action special site at NTV (Japanese)

Seinen manga
Japanese drama television series